The 1979 Perth State of Origin Carnival was the 20th Australian National Football Carnival, an Australian football competition. It was the first carnival to take place under the State of Origin format.

All of the Section One finals were played on Subiaco Oval, in October. Western Australia won the final, defeating Victoria.  WA's captain, Brian Peake won the Tassie Medal as the tournament's best player.

Results

Section One

Section Two
The ACT, coached by Kevin Delmenico, had only two players with VFL experience in their team -  captain Kevin Neale and Fitzroy's Michael Conlan. Their only match was against Warren Roper's Queensland, who had failed to qualify for Section One. The Australian Capital Territorians themselves had qualified for the Section Two Final by winning a play-off against the Australian Amateurs, New South Wales and Northern Territory earlier in the year.

Section Two Qualifying

Squads

Section One

Section Two

Honours

All-Australians
At the conclusion of the tournament, the best players were selected in the All-Australian team.  It was the first All-Australian team named since 1972.  Victoria had the most representatives chosen, with seven, with Western Australia and South Australia each having five players selected.

Leading goal-kickers
 Michael Roach (TAS) - 9 goals
 Richard Rushbrook (QLD) - 8 goals
 Tony Buhagiar (WA) - 7 goals
 Barry Clarke (QLD) - 7 goals
 Peter Hudson (TAS) - 7 goals
 Peter Spencer (WA) - 7 goals
 Garry Wilson (VIC) - 7 goals

Tassie Medalist
 Brian Peake (WA) - 11 votes
 Bruce Monteath (WA) - 7 votes
 Robert Flower (Vic) - 6 votes
 Kym Hodgeman (SA) - 5 votes
 Ken Hunter (WA) - 4 votes
 Bruce Lindsay (SA) - 3 votes
 David Cloke (Vic) - 2 votes
 Geoff Raines (Vic) - 2 votes
 Kevin Bartlett (Vic) - 2 votes
 Michael Roach (Tas) - 2 votes
 Peter Jonas (SA) - 1 vote
 Graham Cornes (SA) - 1 vote
 Darryl Sutton (Vic) - 1 vote
 Robert Shaw (Tas) - 1 vote

References

Australian rules football State of Origin
Perth State Of Origin Carnival, 1979